Garrett Evan James Caldwell (born 6 November 1973) is an American-born Canadian former soccer player who played as a goalkeeper in the Football League for Colchester United. He represented Canada at under-20 and under-23 levels.

Club career

Born in Princeton, New Jersey, Caldwell attended University of British Columbia, playing for the men's soccer team, British Columbian Tigers. He also played for Canadian Soccer League team Winnipeg Fury.

Caldwell moved to England in 1995 to play for Football League club Colchester United. He made six first-team appearances for the U's between 1995 and 1998, making his debut in a Football League Trophy defeat to Swindon Town on 8 November 1995.

Caldwell left Colchester in 1998, returning to Canada to join up with Toronto Supra.

International career

At the age of 18, Caldwell was a member of the Canada under-20 team that finished in third place at the 1992 CONCACAF U-20 Tournament which was held in Canada. He played five games for the under-20s in 1992, also featuring in the Paolo Valenti Trophy held in Italy.

Caldwell was later selected in the Canada under-23 team, featuring in the 1995 Pan American Games qualifying rounds and totalling another five appearances during the year. He was a member of the 1996 Olympic qualifying team, although he failed to make an appearance.

References

1973 births
Living people
People from Princeton, New Jersey
Sportspeople from Middlesex County, New Jersey
Soccer players from New Jersey
Association football goalkeepers
Canadian soccer players
Canadian expatriate soccer players
Canada men's youth international soccer players
Canada men's under-23 international soccer players
Canadian Soccer League (1998–present) players
Expatriate footballers in England
Winnipeg Fury players
Canadian Soccer League (1987–1992) players
Princeton Tigers men's soccer players
Colchester United F.C. players
SC Toronto players
English Football League players
Sportspeople from Mercer County, New Jersey
Canadian expatriate sportspeople in England